Ridgeview Middle School may refer to:

In the United States
 Ridgeview Middle School (Texas), in Round Rock, Texas
 Ridgeview Middle School (Maryland), in Gaithersburg, Maryland
 Ridgeview Middle School (Georgia), in Sandy Springs, Georgia
 Ridgeview Middle School (Ohio), in Columbus Ohio 

In Canada
 Ridgeview Middle School (New Brunswick), in Oromocto, New Brunswick